The Ludzidzini Royal Village is the home to the House of Dlamini, the royal family of Eswatini, currently led by Ngwenyama (King) Mswati III (born 1968) and Ndlovukati (Queen Mother) Ntfombi (born ). The village is also known for reed dance ceremony.

References

Swazi monarchy
Populated places in Eswatini
Royal residences in Eswatini